Mushan (also Romanized as Mūshān; also known as Kūshān and Khūshān) is a village in Zeberkhan Rural District, Zeberkhan District, Nishapur County, Razavi Khorasan Province, Iran. At the 2006 census, its population was 346, in 110 families.

References 

Populated places in Nishapur County